Communauté d'agglomération du Bocage Bressuirais is the communauté d'agglomération, an intercommunal structure, centred on the town of Bressuire. It is located in the Deux-Sèvres department, in the Nouvelle-Aquitaine region, western France. Created in 2014, its seat is in Bressuire. Its area is 1318.8 km2. Its population was 73,944 in 2019, of which 19,850 in Bressuire proper.

Composition
The communauté d'agglomération consists of the following 33 communes:

L'Absie
Argentonnay
Boismé
Bressuire
Bretignolles
Cerizay
Chanteloup
La Chapelle-Saint-Laurent
Chiché
Cirières
Clessé
Combrand
Courlay
Faye-l'Abbesse
La Forêt-sur-Sèvre
Geay
Genneton
Largeasse
Mauléon
Moncoutant-sur-Sèvre
Montravers
Neuvy-Bouin
Nueil-les-Aubiers
La Petite-Boissière
Le Pin
Saint-Amand-sur-Sèvre
Saint-André-sur-Sèvre
Saint-Aubin-du-Plain
Saint-Maurice-Étusson
Saint-Paul-en-Gâtine
Saint-Pierre-des-Échaubrognes
Trayes
Voulmentin

References

Bocage Bressuirais
Bocage Bressuirais